Mr. X ("Mister X") is a 1984 film, directed and written by Khwaja Ahmad Abbas. The music was scored by Ravindra Jain.

Plot

The story is based on science fiction, featuring the character Amar (Amol Palekar), a scientist who overcomes all obstacles. The lead characters are played by Amol Palekar and Shabana Azmi.

Cast

Soundtrack

References

External links

1980s Hindi-language films
1984 films
Films scored by Ravindra Jain